The Lennox Bridge is a heritage-listed sandstone single arch bridge across the Parramatta River, located in Parramatta in Western Sydney, New South Wales, Australia. The bridge was designed by and built under the supervision of David Lennox, the first Colonial Superintendent of Bridges using convict labour between 1836 and 1839. The Lennox Bridge is the third oldest surviving masonry bridge in New South Wales. The bridge carries Church Street, the main north-south street of Parramatta's central business district. It was added to the New South Wales State Heritage Register on 2 April 1999.

History

The Lennox Bridge is on the site of the earliest documented crossing of the Parramatta River in the Parramatta area, dating from early colonial settlement. The current bridge is the third on, or adjacent to, the site. The first was a simple timber footbridge which was destroyed by floods in 1795. The second bridge, called the Gaol Bridge, was built on stone piers with timber railings and was completed between 1802 and 1804.

The current Lennox Bridge is a single span stone elliptical arch bridge over Parramatta River on the line of Church Street, and is constructed of sandstone sourced from the Parramatta Female Factory quarry. Completed in 1839, the bridge cost £1,797 to complete.

In 1885-86 the Department of Public Works removed the wall on the upstream (i.e. western) side of the bridge to widen it, and put up the present railing at the same time. In 1901-02 the bridge was strengthened internally for the Castle Hill Tramway. In 1912 the parapet on the western side was removed, providing a cantilevered pedestrian way. In 1934-35 this new section was removed, the Department of Main Roads widening the bridge in order to handle increased traffic. This modification saw the replacement of the cantilevered walk-way with an open concrete type and the straightening of the curved western face.

In the 1990s Lennox Bridge was saved from demolition by campaigning by the National Trust of Australia (NSW).

Description 
Lennox Bridge is a single sandstone arch bridge spanning 91 feet (27.73m), the clear span of the arch being 23.16 m across the Parramatta River with approaches on the line of Church St.

Construction of tunnels for pedestrians and cyclists

In 2012 a controversial proposal to construct tunnels through the bridge on both sides of the bank for pedestrians and cyclists was approved by Parramatta City Council; and work began in early 2014 with expectations to open before Christmas that year. However, there was a delay attributed to archeological investigations that uncovered a sandstone pier and timber girders of the second bridge on that site, built between 1802 and 1804. While both portals opened in 2015, the southern tunnel is currently closed off to assist with the construction of the Parramatta Light Rail (due to be complete in 2023), and The Lennox, a riverfront high-rise residential apartment building, which will include a new public walkway on the western side of the southern tunnel.

Parramatta Light Rail 

In 2019, construction began on the state significant project of the Parramatta Light Rail (Stage One), servicing Westmead to Carlingford via the Parramatta CBD and Camellia with a two-way track spanning 12 kilometres, and is expected to open in 2023. As part of the project, a light rail and pedestrian zone would be established on Church Street between Market Street and Macquarie Street (including the Lennox Bridge) and the existing bridge would be retained, including the recently constructed active transport portals through the approaches, and would serve as a crossing for light rail, pedestrians and emergency vehicles only (i.e. no general road traffic).

Heritage listing 

Lennox Bridge is one of Parramatta's most important historic structures, and one of the earliest bridges in New South Wales and Australia. It is an example of the work of notable engineer David Lennox. The site possesses potential to contribute to an understanding of early urban development in Parramatta. The bridge is both historically and technically significant, and is rare.

Lennox Bridge, Parramatta was listed on the New South Wales State Heritage Register on 2 April 1999.

See also

 List of bridges in Sydney
 Historic bridges of New South Wales

References

Attribution

External links

Bridges completed in 1802
Bridges completed in 1839
Deck arch bridges
Bridges in Sydney
Transport infrastructure in Parramatta
Sandstone bridges in Australia
Convictism in New South Wales
Streets in Sydney
History of New South Wales
1839 establishments in Australia
New South Wales State Heritage Register
Road bridges in New South Wales
Stone arch bridges in Australia